Gorno is a comune (municipality) in the Province of Bergamo in the Italian region of Lombardy, located about  northeast of Milan and about  northeast of Bergamo.

The municipality of Gorno contains the frazioni (subdivisions, mainly villages and hamlets) Riso, Chignolo, Erdeno, Campello, and Sant'Antonio.

Gorno borders the following municipalities: Casnigo, Colzate, Oneta, Ponte Nossa, Premolo.

Demographic evolution

References